Leinleiter is a stream in the Franconian Switzerland, part of the Franconian Alb, Bavaria, Germany. It flows into the Wiesent near Ebermannstadt.

See also
List of rivers of Bavaria

References

Rivers of Bavaria
Rivers of Germany